David Arell ( – ) was a Revolutionary War officer, politician, and judge. Arell served as mayor of Alexandria in 1786 and was a longtime acquaintance and personal attorney of George Washington.

Early life and family 
David Arell was born around 1750 in Philadelphia, Pennsylvania, the son of Richard Arell (a merchant). By the early 1770s, Arell's family had moved to Alexandria. He became acquainted with George Washington as early at April 1773, and is included in his diary entries.

On May 12, 1785, Arell married Phoebe Caverly in Fairfax County, Virginia. They had two children, Richard and Christina. In 1790, Arell petitioned for a divorce from his wife due to her alleged infidelity, with court documents referring to her as "practically a prostitute."

American Revolutionary War 
During the American Revolution, Arell served as a lieutenant and later captain of Company No. 2 in the 3rd Virginia Regiment, Alexandria's "Independent Blues" militia. He resigned from the army in February 1778 to return to his law practice.

Career 
Arell was a prominent attorney and practiced law in the city for several years. He also served as justice of the regional Hustings Court. Arell was active in real estate and had several property and land holdings in Alexandria and Fredericksburg. Arell was granted 4,000 acres of land by the Virginia General Assembly.

In 1780, George Washington sought Arell's advice and legal representation during a legal dispute. In the same year, Arell was selected as one of the first trustees and council members of Alexandria.

Beginning in April 1786, Arell briefly served as the mayor of Alexandria following the death of incumbent mayor James Kirk. He was also an active member of the Alexandria-Washington Lodge No. 22.

In the 1780s and 1790s, Arell helped to raise funds to support Washington College.

Death and legacy 
Arell died around 1792. He is buried at the Old Presbyterian Meeting House in Alexandria. Arell is listed as a qualifying ancestor by the Daughters of the American Revolution.

Arell's Alexandria home at 219 South Lee Street is included in historic walking tours of the city. "Arell Court" is a street in Alexandria.

References 

18th-century American politicians
Mayors of Alexandria, Virginia
1750 births
1792 deaths
People from Philadelphia
Continental Army officers from Virginia
Virginia politicians